Untitled, 1989, is a bronze abstract sculpture by Joel Shapiro.

Constructed in 1989, it is located at the National Gallery of Art Sculpture Garden.

See also
 List of public art in Washington, D.C., Ward 2
 Untitled (Shapiro, 1990)

References

Outdoor sculptures in Washington, D.C.
1989 sculptures
Collections of the National Gallery of Art
Bronze sculptures in Washington, D.C.
National Gallery of Art Sculpture Garden